Bátori Mária is an 1840 Hungarian opera by Ferenc Erkel.

The opera is taken from a popular stage play in prose by András Dugonics (1793). The Hungarian Theatre signed the opera in March 1838, soon after Erkel had joined the company.

The plot of Bátori Mária is based upon the tragic story of Inês de Castro, the lover and posthumously-recognized wife of King Peter I of Portugal.

References

Hungarian-language operas
Operas by Ferenc Erkel
1840 operas
Operas set in Portugal
Operas